Muhammad Shafiq Afridi is a Pakistani politician who was a member of the Provincial Assembly of Khyber Pakhtunkhwa from August 2019 to January 2023.

Political career
Afridi contested 2019 Khyber Pakhtunkhwa provincial election on 20 July 2019 from constituency PK-107 (Khyber-III) as an independent. He won the election by the majority of 1,368 votes over the runner up Hameed Ullah Jan Afridi, also an independent. He garnered 9,796 votes while Hameedullah Afridi received 8,428 votes.

References

Living people
Politicians from Khyber Pakhtunkhwa
Year of birth missing (living people)